"Candidatus Bartonella bandicootii" is a candidatus bacteria from the genus of Bartonella which was isolated from fleas (Pygiopsylla tunneyi).

References

Bartonellaceae
Bacteria described in 2011
Candidatus taxa